Charles Lyall is the name of two people, both connected to British rule over India:

Charles James Lyall (1845-1920), civil servant and Arabic scholar
Charles Ross Lyall (1880-1950), soldier and first-class cricketer

See also
Charles Lyell (disambiguation)
Charles Lyle (disambiguation)